The Gunn River is a river on the West Coast of New Zealand. It starts in the Price Range in Westland Tai Poutini National Park and flows east into the Whataroa River, which eventually drains into the Tasman Sea.

See also
List of rivers of New Zealand

References

Land Information New Zealand - Search for Place Names

Westland District
Rivers of the West Coast, New Zealand
Westland Tai Poutini National Park
Rivers of New Zealand